John Moloney may refer to:

 John Moloney (Irish politician) (born 1953), Irish Fianna Fáil politician
 John Moloney (Australian politician), Western Australian state MP
 John Moloney (rugby union) (born 1949), Irish international rugby union player
 John Moloney (comedian), British comedian
 John Moloney (businessman) (born 1954), Irish businessman
 John Moloney (Australian footballer) (1881–1948), Australian rules footballer
 John Moloney (referee) (1935–2006), Irish Gaelic football and hurling referee
 John Moloney (musician)

See also
 John Maloney (disambiguation)
 John Molony (1927–2018), Australian historian